Lithurgus is a genus of bees in the family Megachilidae.

Species

 Lithurgus albofimbriatus
 Lithurgus andrewsi Cockerell, 1909
 Lithurgus atratiformis Cockerell, 1905
 Lithurgus atratus Smith, 1853
 Lithurgus australior Cockerell, 1919
 Lithurgus bractipes Perkins & Cheesman, 1928
 Lithurgus cephalotes (van der Zanden, 1977)
 Lithurgus chrysurus Fonscolombe, 1834 (Mediterranean wood-boring bee)
 Lithurgus collaris Smith, 1873
 Lithurgus collieri Cockerell, 1929
 Lithurgus cornutus (Fabricius, 1787)
 Lithurgus dentipes Smith & F., 1853
 Lithurgus fortis Cockerell, 1929
 Lithurgus guamensis Cockerell
 Lithurgus huberi Ducke
 Lithurgus hypoleucus Cockerell, 1937
 Lithurgus illudens Saussure, 1890
 Lithurgus lissopoda (Cameron, 1908)
 Lithurgus magnus (Rahman, 1997)
 Lithurgus nigricans (Cameron, 1898)
 Lithurgus ogasawarensis Yasumatsu, 1955
 Lithurgus pullatus Vachal, 1903
 Lithurgus rufipes Smith, 1853
 Lithurgus scabrosus (Smith, 1859)
 Lithurgus schauinslandi Alfken
 Lithurgus sparganotes (Schletterer, 1891)
 Lithurgus spiniferus Cameron, 1905
 Lithurgus taprobanae (Cameron, 1904)
 Lithurgus tibialis Morawitz, 1875
 Lithurgus tiwarii Gupta & Tewari, 1987
 Lithurgus unifasciatus Radoszkowski, 1882
 Lithurgus xishuangense Wu, 2006

References

Further reading

External links

 

Megachilidae
Articles created by Qbugbot